Christopher Daniel Duntsch (born April 3, 1971) is a former American neurosurgeon who has been nicknamed Dr. D. and Dr. Death for gross malpractice resulting in the maiming of several patients' spines and two deaths while working at hospitals in the Dallas–Fort Worth metroplex.

Duntsch was accused of injuring 33 out of 38 patients in less than two years before his license was revoked by the Texas Medical Board. In 2017, he was convicted of maiming one of his patients and sentenced to life imprisonment.

Early life
Christopher Duntsch was born in Montana and spent most of his youth in Memphis, Tennessee. His father, Donald, was a physical therapist and Christian missionary, and his mother, Susan, was a schoolteacher. He is a graduate of Evangelical Christian School in the Cordova suburb of Memphis, where he starred in football. 

Duntsch initially attended Millsaps College to play Division III college football, and later transferred to Division I Colorado State University. Former teammates later said that, while Duntsch trained hard, he lacked talent at the game. Duntsch returned home to attend Memphis State University (now the University of Memphis).

Medical training
Having exhausted his football eligibility, Duntsch decided to switch to a career in medicine. Duntsch completed his undergraduate degree in 1995, then continued on to an ambitious MD–PhD program. In 2010, he completed the MD–PhD and neurosurgery residency programs at the University of Tennessee Health Science Center, and subsequently completed a spine fellowship program at the Semmes-Murphey Clinic in Memphis.

Duntsch completed his residency having participated in fewer than 100 surgeries. Typically, neurosurgery residents participate in over 1,000 surgeries in the course of their residency. He was suspected of being under the influence of cocaine while operating during his fourth year of residency training, and was sent to a program for impaired physicians. He remained there for several months before being allowed to return to the residency. Several of his friends recalled him going to work after a night of doing drugs, with one of them saying he would never allow Duntsch to operate on him.

While in Memphis, Duntsch began a long-term relationship with Wendy Renee Young. They have two sons.

Career
Initially, Duntsch focused heavily on the PhD half of his degree. His name appeared on several papers and patents, and he took part in a number of biotech startups. However, by the time he met Young, Duntsch was over $500,000 in debt. He decided to turn to neurosurgery, which can be a lucrative field. In 2010, Duntsch moved to Dallas. He persuaded Young to come with him; Young agreed, since she had grown up in the Dallas area. 

Upon applying for work, he looked extremely qualified on paper: he had spent a total of fifteen years in training (medical school, residency and fellowship), and his curriculum vitae was twelve single-spaced pages. Duntsch also claimed to have graduated magna cum laude from St. Jude Children’s Research Hospital with a doctorate in microbiology – a program that the hospital did not offer at the time he allegedly attended.

Duntsch joined Baylor Regional Medical Center at Plano (now Baylor Scott & White Medical Center – Plano) as a minimally invasive spine surgeon with a salary of $600,000 per year, plus bonuses.

Baylor Plano
Early in his tenure at Baylor Plano, Duntsch made a poor impression on his fellow surgeons. Veteran vascular surgeon Randall Kirby recalled that Duntsch frequently boasted about his abilities despite being so new to the area. Kirby also recalled that Duntsch's skills in the operating room left much to be desired; as Kirby put it, "he could not wield a scalpel".

Several of Duntsch's surgeries at Baylor Plano resulted in severely maimed patients:
 Kenneth Fennell, the first patient Duntsch operated on at Baylor Plano, was left with chronic pain after Duntsch operated on the wrong part of his back. Due to the debilitating pain, Fennell later had a second operation by Duntsch to relieve it, and was left significantly paralyzed in his legs. Fennell required months of rehabilitation to be able to walk with a cane, and was left unable to walk for more than 30 feet or stand for more than a few minutes without having to sit down again.
 Lee Passmore, a Collin County medical investigator, experienced chronic pain and limited mobility after Duntsch cut a ligament which was not normally touched during that particular procedure, misplaced hardware in his spine, placed a screw which kept the hardware in place in an incorrect location in his spine, and stripped the threads so it could not be removed. Even if Duntsch had not stripped the threads, he placed the screw in a location that would have caused Passmore to bleed out if it had been removed. Vascular surgeon Mark Hoyle, who assisted with the operation, later recalled that Duntsch seemed oblivious to considerable bleeding. Hoyle became so disturbed by Duntsch's actions that at one point he physically restrained him. He later told Duntsch to his face that he was dangerous. Duntsch's behavior led Hoyle to wonder about his sanity.
 Barry Morguloff, the owner of a pool service company, was left with bone fragments in his spinal canal after Duntsch tried to pull a damaged disc out of his back with a grabbing tool. Duntsch initially refused to give Morguloff any pain medicine, claiming Morguloff was a "drug seeker". Morguloff eventually lost most of the function on his left side and required a wheelchair. Kirby assisted with the surgery and recalled Duntsch continued making mistakes even after having the correct anatomy pointed out to him. Morguloff later recalled that he walked out on a follow-up visit with Duntsch when Duntsch displayed clear signs of being inebriated.
 Jerry Summers, a longtime friend of Duntsch's, came to Plano to have two neck vertebrae fused. During the operation, after Duntsch botched the removal of the disk, Summers was rendered a quadriplegic. Duntsch performed a second surgery and packed the space with a large amount of gel foam, constricting the spinal cord. The anesthesiologist who worked on the surgery recalled that Summers lost almost 1,200 milliliters of blood, more than a fifth of his blood volume and almost 24 times the typical amount of blood lost in a spinal fusion. The nurses and other staffers who took part in the surgery fully expected Summers to have revision surgery, but Duntsch refused to do it. Summers later stated that he and Duntsch had used cocaine the night before his surgery. Despite his passing a drug test, Baylor Plano officials were concerned enough to force Duntsch on leave pending a peer review. While Duntsch was cleared to resume operating while the review was underway, hospital officials asked him to limit himself to minor surgeries until it was complete. Summers subsequently admitted the cocaine claim was untrue and said he was upset that Duntsch refused to check on him. Summers remained a quadriplegic for the rest of his life; he died in 2021 of an infection related to complications from Duntsch's operation.
 Kellie Martin was undergoing a routine back operation when Duntsch cut through her spinal cord and severed an artery. Duntsch continued operating despite clear signs that Martin was losing massive amounts of blood. He refused to abort the surgery even after a trauma surgeon colleague and an anesthesiologist warned him about the blood loss. He refused to acknowledge anything was wrong, hindering the ICU team's efforts to save her. When Martin awoke from anesthesia, she was screaming and clawing at her legs, forcing the ICU team to re-anesthetize her. Duntsch also stayed out in the ICU waiting room writing notes rather than attending his patient, even after Martin went into hemorrhagic cardiac arrest. Martin ultimately bled to death.

Baylor Plano officials found that Duntsch failed to meet their standards of care and permanently revoked his surgical privileges. The hospital initiated another peer review, but Duntsch resigned rather than face certain termination. To avoid the costs of fighting and possibly losing a wrongful termination suit, hospital officials reached a deal with Duntsch's lawyers in which Duntsch was allowed to resign in return for Baylor Plano issuing a letter stating that there were no issues with him. Had Duntsch been fired, Baylor Plano would have been required to report him to the National Practitioner Data Bank (NPDB), which is intended to flag problematic physicians.

Dallas Medical Center
Duntsch moved to Dallas Medical Center in Farmers Branch, where he was granted temporary privileges until hospital officials could obtain his records from Baylor Plano. However, red flags surfaced early on, as nurses wondered if Duntsch was under the influence of drugs while on duty. For instance, he came to work wearing the same tattered scrubs for three days in a row. He lasted for less than a week before administrators pulled his privileges after the death of a patient, Floella Brown, and the maiming of another, Mary Efurd.

Duntsch had severed Brown's vertebral artery, and refused to abort despite the massive blood loss. He then packed it with too much of a substance intended to stop the bleeding. She suffered a stroke as a result. Duntsch did not respond to messages from the hospital for a few hours, then the next day scheduled an elective surgery on Efurd rather than care for Brown. Hospital officials were exasperated when Duntsch refused to delay Efurd's surgery, and asked him multiple times to care for Brown or transfer her out of his care. Duntsch suggested drilling a hole in Brown's head to relieve the pressure, but was refused permission. Not only was he not qualified for and held no privileges to perform brain surgery, but Dallas Medical did not have the proper equipment or personnel for such an operation. Brown was left in a coma for hours before Duntsch finally acquiesced to her transfer. By this time, however, Brown was brain dead.

While operating on Efurd, Duntsch severed one of her nerve roots during spinal fusion surgery while operating on the wrong portion of her back, twisted a screw into another nerve, left screw holes on the opposite side of her spine, failed to remove the disc he was supposed to remove, and left surgical hardware in her muscle tissue so loose that it moved when touched. Despite several warnings from his colleagues that he was not doing the surgery correctly and was attempting to put screws into muscle rather than bone, Duntsch persisted. Efurd was left paralyzed. She later recalled waking up feeling "excruciating pain", a "ten-plus" on a scale of 1 to 10. Several people who were in the operating room for Efurd's surgery suspected that Duntsch might have been intoxicated, recalling that his pupils were dilated.

Longtime spine surgeon Robert Henderson performed the salvage surgery on Efurd. When Henderson saw the imaging from Duntsch's surgery, he was certain that there would be legal action, and had the salvage surgery recorded. He likened what he found when he opened Efurd up to the results of a child playing with Tinkertoys or an erector set. Henderson described Duntsch's surgery as an "assault", and concluded that Efurd would have been bedridden had the salvage surgery not been performed.

Henderson later recalled wondering if Duntsch was an impostor; he could not believe that a real surgeon would botch Efurd's surgery so badly. He felt that anyone with a basic knowledge of human anatomy would know that he was operating in the wrong area of Efurd's back. Henderson sent Duntsch's picture to the University of Tennessee to determine whether he actually had a degree from that institution and received confirmation that Duntsch, in fact, did. He called Duntsch's fellowship supervisor in Memphis, as well as the supervisor of Duntsch's residency; it was then that he learned about the incident that led him to be referred to the impaired physician program. 

Despite both of his surgeries at Dallas Medical Center going catastrophically awry, hospital officials did not report him to the NPDB. At the time, hospitals were not required to report doctors who only had temporary privileges.

Other hospitals
After leaving Dallas Medical Center, Duntsch received privileges at South Hampton Community Hospital in Dallas and also took a job at an outpatient clinic named Legacy Surgery Center (now Frisco Ambulatory Surgery Center) in Frisco. While there, he damaged patient Jeff Cheney's spinal cord, leaving him without feeling on the right side of his body. He damaged patient Philip Mayfield's spinal cord, drilling into it and leaving him partially paralyzed from the neck down. After undergoing physical rehabilitation, Mayfield was able to walk with a cane but continued to experience paralysis on the right side of his body and in his left arm. He also reported shooting pains throughout his body. Mayfield died of COVID-19 in February 2021; according to his wife, he had been vulnerable to the virus due to complications caused by Duntsch's botched surgeries. 

While attempting to remove degenerated discs in Marshall "Tex" Muse's back, Duntsch left surgical hardware floating between the spine and muscle tissue. Muse woke up in considerable pain, but Duntsch convinced him it was normal. He then prescribed Muse so much Percocet that a pharmacist refused to fill the prescription. Muse spiraled into opioid addiction that cost him his wife and his job. He later recalled that he read about Martin's death on the day before the surgery, but Duntsch cursed him out when he called to ask about it. While operating on Jacqueline Troy, Duntsch cut one of her vocal cords and an artery and also damaged her trachea. Troy was left barely able to speak above a whisper, had to be sedated for weeks and had to be fed through a feeding tube for some time as food was getting into her lungs. Despite this, Duntsch was retained by South Hampton when new owners bought it and renamed it University General Hospital.

When Duntsch applied for privileges at Methodist Hospital in Dallas, the hospital queried the NPDB. Soon afterward, he severely maimed Jeff Glidewell after mistaking part of his neck muscle for a tumor during a routine cervical fusion, severing one of his vocal cords, cutting a hole in his esophagus and slicing an artery. Duntsch stuffed a surgical sponge in Glidewell's throat to stanch the bleeding. However, he closed Glidewell with the sponge in place despite others in the operating room warning him about it. The sponge triggered a severe blood-borne infection that caused Glidewell to become septic. When other doctors discovered the sponge, Duntsch refused to return to help remove it. After several days, Kirby was brought in to repair the damage and later described what he found after opening Glidewell back up as the work of a "crazed maniac". He later told Glidewell that it was clear Duntsch had tried to kill him. Glidewell was left with only one vocal cord, permanent damage to his esophagus and partial paralysis on his left side. Kirby claimed that it looked as if Duntsch had tried to decapitate Glidewell and contended that such a botched surgery "has not happened in the United States of America" before. Glidewell was reportedly still suffering the ill effects of Duntsch's operation years later and has undergone more than 50 procedures to correct the damage. At one point, he was only able to eat small bites of food at one time. He proved to be Duntsch's last surgery; University General pushed him out soon afterward.

Medical license revoked
Kirby wrote a detailed complaint to the Texas Medical Board, calling Duntsch a "sociopath" who was "a clear and present danger to the citizens of Texas." Under heavy lobbying from Kirby and Henderson, the Texas Medical Board suspended Duntsch's license on June 26, 2013. The lead investigator on the case later revealed that she wanted Duntsch's license suspended while the ten-month probe was underway, but board attorneys were not willing to go along. Board chairman Irwin Zeitzler later said that complications in neurosurgery were more common than most laymen believe, and it took until June 2013 to find the "pattern of patient injury" required to justify suspending Duntsch's license. He added that many board members found it hard to believe that a trained surgeon could be as incompetent as Duntsch appeared to be. 

The board called in veteran neurosurgeon Martin Lazar to review the case. Lazar was scathingly critical of Duntsch's work. For instance, he upbraided him for missing the signs that Martin was bleeding out, saying that, "You can't not know [that] and be a neurosurgeon." The Texas Medical Board revoked Duntsch's license on December 6, 2013.   Texas Medical Board Revocation Order.

Duntsch moved to Denver, Colorado, and went into a downward spiral. He declared bankruptcy after listing debts of over $1 million. He was arrested for DUI in Denver, taken for a psychiatric evaluation in Dallas during one of his visits to see his children, and was arrested in Dallas for shoplifting.

Lawsuits
In March 2014, three former patients of Mary Efurd, Kenneth Fennel, and Lee filed separate federal lawsuits against Baylor Plano, alleging the hospital allowed Duntsch to perform surgeries despite knowing that he was a dangerous physician. Texas Attorney General and current Governor Greg Abbott filed a motion to intervene in the suits to defend Baylor Plano, citing the Texas legislature's 2003 statute that placed a medical malpractice cap of $250,000 and removed the term "gross negligence" from the definition of legal malice. The suit alleged that Baylor Plano made an average net profit of $65,000 on every spinal surgery performed by Duntsch.

Criminal charges
Henderson and Kirby feared that Duntsch could move elsewhere and still theoretically get a medical license. Convinced that he was a clear and present danger to the public, they urged the Dallas County district attorney's office to pursue criminal charges. The inquiry went nowhere until 2015, when the statute of limitations on any potential charges was due to run out. Part of the problem was being able to prove that Duntsch's actions were willful as defined by Texas law. After interviewing dozens of Duntsch's patients and their survivors, prosecutors concluded that Duntsch's actions were indeed criminal, and nothing short of imprisonment would prevent him from practicing medicine again. 

As part of their investigation, prosecutors obtained a December 2011 email in which Duntsch boasted that he was "... ready to leave the love and kindness and goodness and patience that I mix with everything else that I am and become a cold-blooded killer." ADA Michelle Shughart, who led the prosecution of Duntsch, later recalled that Henderson, Kirby, and Lazar contacted her demanding to testify against Duntsch; according to Shughart, doctors almost never testify against each other. In an article for The Texas Prosecutor, the journal of the Texas District and County Attorneys Association, Shughart and the other members of the trial team recalled that their superiors were initially skeptical when they presented the case, but eventually found themselves in "overwhelming disbelief" that a surgeon could do what Duntsch was accused of doing. As the trial team put it, the "scary pattern" of Duntsch's actions became apparent to the others in the office, leading the DA to give the green light to take the case to a grand jury.

Arrest and prosecution
In July 2015, approximately a year and a half after his license was revoked, Duntsch was arrested in Dallas and charged with six felony counts of aggravated assault with a deadly weapon, five counts of aggravated assault causing serious bodily injury, and one count of injury to an elderly person. The indictments were made four months before the statute of limitations were to run out. 

The last charge was for the maiming and paralyzing of Efurd. Prosecutors put a high priority on that charge, as it provided the widest sentencing range, with Duntsch facing up to life in prison if convicted. They also believed that charge would be easy to prove in court; Duntsch had been told repeatedly that he was not placing the hardware in the correct position and fluoroscopy images from Efurd's surgery proved this. Prosecutors sought a sentence long enough to ensure that Duntsch would never be able to practice medicine again. For the same reason, prosecutors opted to try Duntsch for Efurd's maiming first. He was held in the Dallas County jail for almost two years until the case went to trial in 2017. By this time, Duntsch was almost penniless, and the judge had to appoint a lawyer for him.

Shughart argued that Duntsch should have known he was likely to hurt others unless he changed his approach, and that his failure to learn from his past mistakes demonstrated that his maiming of Efurd was intentional. Prosecutors also faulted Duntsch's employers for not reporting him. They argued that Duntsch was motivated to continue operating because the lucrative salary of a neurosurgeon would solve his mounting financial problems.

Over objections from Duntsch's lawyers, prosecutors called many of Duntsch's other patients to the stand in order to prove that his actions were intentional. According to his lawyers, Duntsch had not realized how poorly he had performed as a surgeon until he heard the prosecution experts tell the jury about his many blunders on the operating table. Duntsch's defense blamed their client's actions on poor training and lack of oversight by the hospitals. Shughart countered that the 2011 email, sent after his first surgeries went wrong, proved that Duntsch knew his actions were intentional.

After 13 days of trial, the jury needed only four hours to convict him for the maiming of Efurd. On February 20, 2017, he was sentenced to life in prison. On December 10, 2018, the Texas Court of Appeals affirmed Duntsch's conviction by a 2–1 split decision. On May 8, 2019, the Texas Court of Criminal Appeals refused Duntsch’s petition for discretionary review. The four hospitals that employed Duntsch have ongoing civil cases against him.

Imprisonment
Duntsch is housed at the O. B. Ellis Unit outside Huntsville. He is not eligible for parole until 2045, when he will be 74 years old.

Reactions
The conviction of Duntsch has been called a precedent-setting case, as it is believed to be the first time that a physician has been convicted on criminal charges for actions in the course of their medical work. The Dallas County district attorney's office called it "a historic case with respect to prosecuting a doctor who had done wrong during surgery."

The director of neurosurgery at UT Southwestern, Carlos Bagley, testifying for the defense, said that "the only way this happens is that the entire system fails the patients." A neurosurgery expert for Duntsch's defense team himself said, "The conditions which created Dr.Duntsch still exist, thereby making it possible for another to come along."

In popular culture 
Wondery Media launched a ten-episode podcast series named Dr. Death, focusing on Duntsch.

Dr. Death, a TV mini-series based on the podcast, began streaming on Peacock on July 15, 2021. It stars Joshua Jackson as Duntsch, Alec Baldwin as Robert Henderson, Christian Slater as Randall Kirby and AnnaSophia Robb as Michelle Shughart. A follow-up docuseries, Dr. Death: The Undoctored Story, was later released on Peacock on July 29, 2021, featuring interviews with some of Duntsch's patients and colleagues, as well as with Henderson, Kirby and Shughart.

In 2019, Duntsch was the focus of the premiere episode of License to Kill, Oxygen's series on criminal medical professionals. In 2021, he was profiled on CNBC's American Greed.

See also 
 Harold Shipman
 Jayant Patel
 Michael Swango

References

External links 
 Podcast about Christopher Duntsch Case
 Dr. Death: The Texas Surgeon Who Paralyzed his Patients
 

1971 births
Living people
21st-century American criminals
American neurosurgeons
American people convicted of assault
American prisoners sentenced to life imprisonment
Medical malpractice
Place of birth missing (living people)
Prisoners sentenced to life imprisonment by Texas
University of Tennessee faculty
University of Tennessee Health Science Center alumni
University of Memphis alumni